Denver Financial Center I is a high-rise office building located at 1775 Sherman Street in Denver, Colorado. Built in 1981 as the Mellon Financial Center, the tower has 32 floors. At , it is currently the 23rd tallest building in Denver. USAA Real Estate purchased the building for $84 million in 2008. In October 2018, the building was sold for $95.25 million to Lincoln Property Company.

See also
List of tallest buildings in Denver

References

External links
Skyscraperpage
Emporis.com

Skyscraper office buildings in Denver
Office buildings completed in 1981